Mohammed Ayub Qureshi (born 1958) is an international lawn and indoor bowler from Pakistan.

Bowls career
In 2018, Qureshi represented Pakistan at the 2018 Commonwealth Games in the Lawn bowls tournament held on the Gold Coast in Australia. It was the first time that Pakistan competed in bowls at the Commonwealth Games.

In 2022, he qualified to represent Pakistan at the 2022 World Bowls Indoor Championships. The event had been cancelled in 2020 and 2021 due to the COVID-19 pandemic.

References

1958 births
Living people